Pseudopulex is a genus of extinct primitive fleas that lived between the Middle Jurassic and Early Cretaceous periods in what is now modern-day China. The Latin root for the name Pseudopulex roughly translates to "false fleas".

Taxonomy 

There are currently four identified species in this genus discovered through fossil remains: Pseudopulex jurassicus, Pseudopulex magnus, Pseudopulex wangi and Pseudopulex tanlan, with most current research focused on P. jurassicus and P. magnus.

Fossils of P. jurassicus date back to the mid-Mesozoic of China, more specifically the middle Jurassic-aged Jiulongshan Formation, making them around 165 million years old, while P. magnus were discovered to be from the Early Cretaceous Yixian Formation, around 125 million years ago. Potential hosts for P. jurassicus include Pedopenna daohugouensis and/or Epidexipteryx hui, while P. magnus may have parasitised Sinosauropteryx prima or Microraptor gui. These organisms have similar features to other studied ectoparasites, and they share traits with present-day fleas, most notably in their wingless bodies and stylets that are very long and sharp, enabling them to through flesh. They also exhibit features that distinguish them from similar parasites, such as lice, including their thinner and more elongate clawed appendages and extended mouthparts. They exhibit some traits that are completely different from modern fleas, which may be an indication of this genus possibly having an early evolution that resulted in a dead-end lineage. Further research is needed into the evolution of fleas, but this genus is most similar to crown fleas. P. tanlan is considered to be somewhat of a transitional organism between P. jurassicus or P. magnus and existing fleas as it has a smaller body plan, more compact antennae, and other features associated with extant fleas. A critical difference from extant fleas, such as crown fleas, is the lack of enlarged hind legs, prohibiting them from jumping or running, which is a common mode of transportation for most extant fleas. Presently, there has been a total of six other flea-like fossils that have been discovered along with this genus.

Description 
Pseudopulex species have flattened bodies, similar to common ectoparasites like ticks or bedbugs.  Even between the species of Pseudopulex, however, there are distinct differences in morphology, with P. jurassicus being slightly longer and containing a shorter stylet while P. magnus are thicker and have very long mouthparts.  P. tanlan has been found to be smaller than other Pseudopulex species at about 10 mm long, with a relatively small head and thoracic cavity. The body of P. tanlan exhibits very short and stiff setae. Compared to P. magnus and P. jurrasicus, P. tanlan has relatively small male genitalia and short tibia on females. P. jurassicus was much larger, with a length of 17 mm and mouthpart length of 3.4 mm, twice the size of its head. This species had very small eyes, antennae, and a short torso covered in long thin bristles. Their legs were also quite long and contained a pair of large claws on the ends of each leg.  P. magnus was even larger, being 22.8mm long with 5.2mm long mouthparts. Their heads were relatively small and bodies compressed and stout compared to P. jurassicus. This species also exhibited antennae, dense setae, and claws on the ends of their legs, but had a very uniquely large abdomen. Line drawings were created using fossils as reference to provide a clearer understanding of morphology. P. wangi females were about 14.8mm long with a small head with relatively short mouthparts and short antennae. This species also exhibited larger eyes and body setae. Males, however, were much smaller and had longer bodies, with genitalia being quite large, indicating P. wangi was more sexually dimorphic than other species in its genus.

Paleobiology  
While these parasites show similar characteristics to modern fleas, they also show major differences in body morphology and size due to the large difference in host, such as more flattened bodies and longer claws. They also possessed serrated stylets, likely for feeding on blood through thick layers of skin.  Moreover, these organisms are likely to be about fifty times larger than the dog flea. It is reported that the puncture of this parasite is compared to a hypodermic needle injection for these large dinosaurs.

Better understanding of these prehistoric fleas can contribute to research into events such as the breakdown of Mesozoic biodiversity and ancient food chain. Furthermore, the method by which ectoparasites switched from solely infecting mammals to being hosted by birds can provide insights into parasitic evolution. The Pseudopulex phylum displays the tremendous diversity present even millions of years ago, along with host-interactions that further aid in the study of ectoparasite evolution in today's world, giving novel insight into evolution, ecology, and host-parasite interactions that can be applied to modern-day ectoparasites.

References 

Fossil taxa described in 2012
Insect enigmatic taxa
Middle Jurassic insects
Late Jurassic insects
Cretaceous insects
Parasitic insects
Parasites of reptiles
Insects described in 2012
Prehistoric insects of Asia
Prehistoric insect genera
Fleas